William Thurman may refer to:

 William E. Thurman (born 1931), United States Air Force general
 William T. Thurman (1908–2001), American attorney
 Bill Thurman (1920–1995), American film and television actor